Lawrence Ennis CMG OBE (31 August 1871 – 5 May 1938) was a Scottish-born engineer.

He was best known as the managing director of Dorman Long and the main supervisor of the construction of the Sydney Harbour Bridge.

Life
Ennis was born in West Calder, Scotland. He was descended from a family of engineers on his maternal line. He went to work in a shale pit from the age of twelve. When he was 15 he emigrated with his family to the United States.

Ennis managed one of the American Bridge Company's largest sites by 1900. Ennis joined Dorman Long in 1903 as superintendent in charge of bridge and constructional works. In 1905 he was made works manager. Ennis became general manager of the company in 1915 and a company director in 1924.

Ennis was appointed OBE in 1918, in reignition of his conversion of the Dorman Long works into a munitions manufacturing site during World War One.

From 1924 to 1932 Ennis was resident in Australia to manage the construction of Sydney Harbour Bridge.

Upon his return to Britain in 1932, Ennis was appointed managing director of Dorman Long. Under his tenure the firm built a large steelworks at Warrenby, Redcar.

He died in 1938.

Publication
 
 As joint author – in Minutes of Proceedings of the Institution of Civil Engineers, Vol. 238 – Session 1933-1934, Pt. 2. London: 1935. 2) Sydney Harbour Bridge: Manufacture of the Structural Steelwork and Erection of the Bridge, by R. Freeman and L. Ennis;

References

1871 births
1938 deaths
People from West Lothian
Scottish engineers
Scottish miners
People from West Calder